Hélder Luís Moreira Ribeiro da Silva Ferreira (born 13 June 1980) is a Portuguese former footballer who played as a central midfielder.

Club career
Born in Penafiel, Porto District, Ferreira spent 13 of his 16 years as a professional with hometown club F.C. Penafiel, arriving in its youth system at the age of 11 and going on represent it in all three major levels of Portuguese football. He played his first official game with the first team on 14 May 2000, also scoring once in a 3–2 away win over S.C. Covilhã in the Segunda Liga.

After one season on loan to F.C. Tirsense in the lower leagues, Ferreira returned to the Estádio Municipal 25 de Abril, appearing in a further three second-division campaigns. In the summer of 2004, he signed with F.C. Marco also in that tier.

Ferreira rejoined Penafiel for a third spell in the 2006 off-season, where he remained until his retirement and also acted as team captain. In 2014–15 he appeared with the side in the Primeira Liga, his first match in the competition occurring on 17 August 2014 (at the age of 34 years and two months) in a 1–3 home loss to C.F. Os Belenenses. He scored in a 3–2 defeat at Rio Ave F.C. on 27 October where he featured as a central defender, also putting one past his own net in the 2–1 away loss against F.C. Paços de Ferreira the following 8 February in an eventual relegation as last.

References

External links

1980 births
Living people
People from Penafiel
Portuguese footballers
Association football midfielders
Primeira Liga players
Liga Portugal 2 players
Segunda Divisão players
F.C. Penafiel players
F.C. Tirsense players
F.C. Marco players
Sportspeople from Porto District